Lochaber is a name applied to a part of the Scottish Highlands. Historically, it was a provincial lordship consisting of the parishes of Kilmallie and Kilmonivaig, as they were before being reduced in extent by the creation of Quoad Sacra parishes in the 19th century. Lochaber once extended from the Northern shore of Loch Leven, a district called Nether Lochaber, to beyond Spean Bridge and Roybridge, which area is known as Brae Lochaber or Braigh Loch Abar in Gaelic. Lochaber is now also used to refer to a much wider area, one of the 16 ward management areas of the Highland Council of Scotland and one of eight former local government districts of the two-tier Highland region. The main town of Lochaber is Fort William.

According to legend, a glaistig, a ghostly woman-goat hybrid, once lived in the area.

Name
William Watson outlined two schools of thought on this topic. He favoured the idea that Abar came from the Pictish and Welsh for "river mouth" and that Loch Abar meant the confluence of the Lochy and the Nevis as they flowed into Loch Linnhe,  in Gaelic. He also conceded that abar might also come from the Gaelic , meaning "mud" or "swampy place". Thus Lochaber could be the "loch of swamps", a historic water feature that existed on the Blàr Mòr, where the area's High School and Health Centre are situated today. Other experts favour the "swamp" derivation. A Lochaber person is called an Abrach.

History 

Lochaber is first recorded in the Life of Columba written in c.690 by Adomnán, the Abbot of Iona Abbey. Although there are no known Pictish stones within the area, Ardnamurchan Point is believed to have marked the boundary between the lands ruled by the Picts to the north and east, and those of the Gaelic kingdom of Dál Riata to the south. 

Archaeological evidence of earlier structures supports the tradition that Inverlochy Castle was built on the site of an earlier Pictish settlement, described by the historian Hector Boece in 1526 as a "city ... much frequented with merchants of France and Spain", but destroyed by the Vikings. Lochaber contains no early monastic locations, but the numerous placenames starting with the element "Kil-" or  "Cille-" suggest early Christian sites dating from the period 600-900, while the placename element "annat" found near Corpach suggests the site of an early mother church.  Placename evidence also suggests the presence of Viking settlements in the Morvern and Ballachulish areas, but nowhere north and east of Fort William.

Lochaber formed part of the Province of Moray from the early 12th century at the latest. It was first recorded as a provincial lordship at the end of the 13th century, but a "Steward of Lochaber" is recorded witnessing a charter sealed by Walter Comyn, Lord of Badenoch in 1234, suggesting that Lochaber had already been granted as a lordship by that date, and had probably, like Badenoch, been granted to Comyn by Alexander II in 1229. 

It was therefore one of the seven lordships created within Moray by ca. 1230 that as well as Badenoch included The Aird, Glencarnie, Abernethy, Stratha'an and Strathbogie. The lordship was made up of the two parishes of Kilmallie and Kilmonivaig and had its caput at Inverlochy Castle.

Lochaber was one of the territories that King Robert Bruce gave to his friend, Angus Og Macdonald, Lord of the Isles, who fought at his side during the First War of Independence, including the successful battle of Bannockburn in 1314. In turn, Angus Og gave Ardnamurchan to his younger brother, Iain Sprangach MacDonald (first of the MacDonalds of Ardnamurchan), and he gave to his natural son, Iain Fraoch MacDonald, Glencoe. In 1376, King Robert II confirmed John Macdonald, Lord of the Isles and son of Angus Og Macdonald, control of Colonsay, Kintyre and Knapdale and granted Lochaber to John and his wife Princess Margaret as a part of her dowry. In turn, John of Islay's son, Donald Macdonald, Lord of the Isles, gave the province to his brother, Alexander, who became Lord of Lochaber and 1st of Keppoch.

In the Middle Ages, Clan Cameron was the principal and dominant clan in Lochaber. Other important clans included: MacDonald of Keppoch, MacMillan and MacIntosh. The Law was intended to be covered by a sheriff based at Inverness; the Sheriffdom also included Skye, Badenoch, and the area west of Inverness between Badenoch and Ross. 

Beginning in 1740, Lochaber was the residence of Fr. Alexander Cameron, a nobleman from Clan Cameron and Roman Catholic priest. For years prior to the Uprising of 1745, Fr. Cameron ran a highly successful vicariate for the still illegal and underground Catholic Church in Scotland in both Lochaber and Strathglass. After the Battle of Culloden in 1746, Fr. Cameron was captured by the British Army and died aboard a prison hulk anchored in the River Thames. He is currently being promoted by the Knights of St Columba for canonization by the Roman Catholic Church.

After the Battle of Culloden in 1746, the local population was decimated by both the Highland Clearances and by voluntary emigration. So much so, that in 1900, Canadian Gaelic poet Alasdair a' Ridse MacDhòmhnaill, the son of Lochaber-born poet and Nova Scotia pioneer Ailean a' Ridse MacDhòmhnaill, wrote, "They say the best singers and Seanachies left Scotland. They left Lochaber for certain."

In the mid 19th century, local government reforms replaced the ancient provinces by new Counties (shires), aligned to sheriffdom boundaries; hence, Lochaber formed the south-western portion of the new shire of Inverness.

Under the Local Government (Scotland) Act 1973, Scottish counties and burghs were abolished, creating a new system of nine two-tier regions and three islands council areas. Hence it was that Invernessshire was merged with other Highland areas, to form the new statutory region of Highland. This lasted from 1975 to 1996. 

Each region consisted of a number of districts (the islands areas were created as unitary council areas). The Lochaber district was created by merging the Ardnamurchan district and the Ballachulish and Kinlochleven electoral divisions of the former county of Argyll with the burgh of Fort William and the district of Lochaber of the former county of Inverness. Therefore, the boundaries of the district included  North Lorne, Glen Coe, Nether Lochaber, the western part of the Rannoch Moor, the Road to the Isles, Moidart, Ardgour, Morvern, Sunart, Ardnamurchan, and the Small Isles (Rùm, Eigg, Muck and Canna).

In 1994 legislation was passed which abolished the regions and districts and established a system of 32 unitary council areas covering the whole of Scotland; all of the Highland districts were merged into the newly unitary Highland council area.

In 1996 the new Highland Council adopted the areas of the former districts as council management areas, and created area committees to represent them. The Lochaber management area then consisted of eight out of the 72 wards of the council area, each electing one councillor by the first past the post system of election. In 1999 ward boundaries were redrawn to create 80 new wards. Management area boundaries were not redrawn, however, and therefore area committees ceased to represent exactly the areas for which they were named and made decisions. The Lochaber committee continued to have eight members. The area manager throughout this period (1996–2007) was John Hutchison.

Ward boundaries were redrawn again in 2007 under the Local Governance (Scotland) Act 2004, and the council abolished its eight management areas in favour of three new corporate management areas and 16 new ward management areas. Each of the 22 new wards elects three or four councillors by the single transferable vote system, a system designed to produce a form of proportional representation, and the total number of councillors remains the same. Various ward management areas, including the Lochaber area, cover more than one ward.

Governance
The Lochaber ward management area is one of five comprising the Highland Council's Ross, Skye and Lochaber corporate management area, which in turn is one of Highland Council's three corporate management areas. The Ross, Skye and Lochaber area consists of six out of the 22 wards of the council area and the Lochaber area consists of two wards, the Caol and Mallaig ward, which elects three councillors, and the Fort William and Ardnamurchan ward, which elects four councillors. Each of the other wards of the corporate area is a separate ward management area.

Lochaber is within the Ross, Skye and Lochaber constituency of the House of Commons of the Parliament of the United Kingdom (at Westminster), but its boundaries are not exactly those of the council corporate management area. The constituency was created in 2005 with boundaries based on those of wards in use during the period 1999 to 2007.

Cultural references
The Shakespearean character Banquo was Thane of Lochaber and a kinsman of his friend Macbeth. His home is reputed to have been at Tor Castle above the River Lochy, near Seangan.

"Lochaber No More" is a traditional folk song, first compiled in 1760 — with additional lyrics penned by Allan Ramsay in the 1720s — but with a melody also known in Ireland (where it may very well have originated) as "Lament for Limerick" or "Limerick's Lamentation". The melody was also popular in England — used in "Amintor's Lamentation for Celia's Unkindness", a broadside ballad from the 19th century. The phrase "Lochaber no more" is borrowed by The Proclaimers as the start of the bridge in their hit song about the Scottish clearances "Letter From America".

Columba
Lochaber is mentioned by Adomnan of Iona in his biography of St Columba on two occasions. Both stories related to Columba using his saintly blessing to raise people out of poverty and make them wealthier.

In the first story, Columba met a poor man named Nesán in Lochaber who had five cows. Columba blessed the poor man's cows and his own descendants, and the poor man's five cows multiplied until he had a herd of one hundred and five cows. 

In the second story, Columba met a beggar in Lochaber who had a wife and children. Columba asked the beggar to fetch him a stick from the forest, and the poor man did so. Columba then sharpened the stick into a stake and gave it to the man, telling him that it would catch game for him, but it would never harm person or cattle. The poor man then took the stake and put it into the forest, and the following day he checked it and found a stag impaled on it. Each day, some new animal fell on it and died. The poor man sold the meat and skins to others and got much profit out of it. However, his wife urged him to get rid of it, because she thought it was too dangerous. The man reluctantly listened to his wife and put the stake next to the wall of his house. But one day, a dog fell on it and got killed. His wife then urged him to get rid of it because it was so dangerous, and the man then put the stake into thick brambles, but the following day he found a goat had somehow impaled itself on the stake through the brambles. He then took the stake to the river Lochy and put it underwater, and returning later he saw a large salmon impaled on it. He then took the stake and set it on the roof of his house, but not long afterwards, a large raven flew by and got impaled on it. The man's wife continued to nag him about how dangerous it was, and so he cut up the stake into pieces and destroyed it. Afterwards he returned to begging again.

Hydroelectric scheme

See also 
 Lochaber axe
 Lochaber Narrow Gauge Railway

References

Further reading

External links 
 

 
Districts of Scotland
Provincial lordships of Scotland